The House of Rain (Spanish: La casa de la lluvia) is a 1943 Spanish drama film directed by Antonio Román and starring Luis Hurtado, Blanca de Silos and Carmen Viance. It is set in Galicia.

Cast
 Luis Hurtado as Fernando Amil  
 Blanca de Silos as Lina  
 Carmen Viance as Teresa Amil  
 Nicolás D. Perchicot as Elías Morell 
 Rafaela Satorrés as Marina 
 Manuel de Juan as Loquero 1  
 Antonio Bayón as Criado  
 Luis Latorre as Director del manicomio  
 Antonio L. Estrada as Loquero 2
 José Ocaña as Ventero

References

Bibliography
 Bentley, Bernard. A Companion to Spanish Cinema. Boydell & Brewer 2008.

External links 

1943 films
1943 drama films
Spanish drama films
1940s Spanish-language films
Films directed by Antonio Román
Films set in Spain
Spanish black-and-white films
1940s Spanish films